Stockton is an English surname. Notable people with the surname include:

Abbye "Pudgy" Stockton (1917–2006), American professional strongwoman
Annis Stockton (1736–1801), American poet
Betsey Stockton (1798–1865), African American educator and missionary
Charles Stockton (1845–1924), American admiral and international law expert
Dave Stockton (born 1941), American golfer
Dave Stockton Jr. (born 1968), American golfer
Dean Stockton, English street artist known as D*Face
Dick Stockton (born 1942), American sportscaster
Dick Stockton (tennis) (born 1951), American tennis player and coach
Doris Stockton (1924–2018), American mathematician
Duston Stockton, Stop the Steal organizer
Frank R. Stockton (1834–1902), American writer and humorist
 A family of American sportspeople:
 Hust Stockton (1901–1967), football player
 John Stockton (born 1962), Hust's grandson, basketball player
 Michael Stockton (born 1989), John's son; basketball player
 David Stockton (born 1991), John's son; basketball player
John Stockton (Michigan soldier) (1798–1878) American territorial legislator
John P. Stockton (1826–1900), American politician
Richard Stockton (1730–1781), American lawyer, signer of the Declaration of Independence
Richard Stockton (1764–1828), American politician
Robert F. Stockton (1795–1866), American naval officer
Thomas Stockton (1781–1846), American soldier and politician
Thomas Stockton (judge) (1609–1674), English-born judge who held office in seventeenth-century Ireland
Layla Stockton, a fictional character from 2012 video game Hitman Absolution.

See also
Stockton (disambiguation)

English-language surnames
English toponymic surnames